The 1984–85 Arizona Wildcats men's basketball team represented the University of Arizona during the 1984–85 NCAA Division I men's basketball season. The team was led by second-year head coach Lute Olson. The Wildcats played its home games in the McKale Center in Tucson, Arizona, and were a member of the Pacific-10 Conference. Arizona finished with an overall record of 21–10 (12–6 Pac-10) and reached the NCAA tournament, but lost in the opening round.

Roster

Schedule and results

|-
!colspan=9 style=| Non-conference regular season

|-
!colspan=9 style=| Pac-10 regular season

|-
!colspan=9 style=| NCAA Tournament

Sources

Rankings

References

Arizona
Arizona Wildcats men's basketball seasons
Arizona
Arizona Wildcats men's basketball team
Arizona Wildcats men's basketball team